This bibliography of Greece is a list of books in the English language which reliable sources indicate relate to the general topic of Greece.

Alexander, Caroline - The war that killed Achilles: the true story of Homer's Iliad.
Alexander the Great: a new history.
Alexander the Great: selected texts from Arrian, Curtius and Plutarch.
Annas, Julia - Ancient philosophy: a very short introduction.
Annas, Julia - Plato: a very short introduction.
Aristotle - Politics.
Armstrong, Karen - The great transformation: the beginning of our religious traditions.
Atsaides, Susie - Greek generations: a medley of ethnic recipes, folklore, and village traditions.
Bagnall, Nigel - The Peloponnesian War: Athens, Sparta and the struggle for Greece.
Barnes, Jonathan - Aristotle: a very short introduction.
Beard, Mary - The Parthenon.
Beaton, Roderick - George Seferis: waiting for the angel: a biography.
Barard, Claude - A city of images: iconography and society in ancient Greece.
Bernal, Martin - Black Athena writes back: Martin Bernal responds to his critics.
Bertman, Stephen - The genesis of science: the story of Greek imagination.
Billows, Richard A. - Marathon: the battle that changed western civilization.
Bowden, Hugh - Mystery cults of the ancient world.
Bowlby, Linda S. - Renaissance woman: a study of women's roles throughout history with accompanying works of art.
Bradford, Ernie - Thermopylae: the battle for the West.
Brewer, David - Greece, the hidden centuries: Turkish rule from the fall of Constantinople to Greek independence.
Broad, William J. - The oracle: ancient Delphi and the science behind its lost secrets.
Budin, Stephanie Lynn - The ancient Greeks: an introduction.
Burckhardt, Jacob - The Greeks and Greek civilization.
Buxton, R. G. A. - The complete world of Greek mythology.
Cahill, Thomas - Sailing the wine-dark sea: why the Greeks matter.
Camp, John - The Athenian Agora: excavations in the heart of classical Athens.
Camp, John - The world of the ancient Greeks.
Cantor, Norman F. - Alexander the Great: journey to the end of the earth.
Cantor, Norman F. - Antiquity: from the birth of Sumerian civilization to the fall of the Roman Empire.
Capponi, Niccolo - The victory of the west: the great Christian-Muslim clash at the battle of Lepanto.
Carroll, Michael - An island in Greece: on the shores of Skopelos.
Cartledge, Paul - Alexander the Great: the hunt for a new past.
Cartledge, Paul - Ancient Greece: a history in eleven cities.
Cartledge, Paul - The Spartans: the world of the warrior-heroes of ancient Greece, from utopia to crisis and collapse.
Cartledge, Paul - Thermopylae: the battle that changed the world.
Castleden, Rodney - Minoans: life in Bronze Age Crete.
Castleden, Rodney - Mycenaeans.
Clark, Bruce - Twice A Stranger: How Mass Expulsion Forged Modern Greece and Turkey. 
Connelly, Joan Breton - Portrait of a priestess: women and ritual in ancient Greece.
Connolly, Peter - Greece and Rome at war.
Cottrell, Leonard - The bull of Minos: the great discoveries of ancient Greece.
Crane, David - Lord Byron's jackal: a life of Edward John Trelawny.
Crowley, Roger - Empires of the sea: the siege of Malta, the Battle of Lepanto, and the contest for the center of the world.
Cunliffe, Barry W. - The extraordinary voyage of Pytheas the Greek.
Curtis, Gregory - Disarmed: the story of the Venus de Milo.
Dalby, Andrew - Rediscovering Homer: inside the origins of the epic.
Davidson, James N. - Courtesans & fishcakes: the consuming passions of classical Athens.
Davidson, James N. - The Greeks and Greek love: a bold new exploration of the ancient world.
Davis, L. J. - Onassis: Aristotle and Christina.
Dempster, Nigel - Heiress: the story of Christina Onassis.
Dinsmoor, William Bell - The architecture of ancient Greece: an account of its historic development.
Dodge, Theodore Ayrault - Alexander: a history of the origin and growth of the art of war from the earliest times to the Battle of Ipsus, 301 BC, with a detailed account of the campaigns of the great Macedonian.
Doherty, P. C. - The death of Alexander the Great: what -- or who --really killed the young conqueror of the known world?
Durando, Furio - Ancient Greece: the dawn of the Western world.
Durrell, Lawrence - Blue thirst.
Durrell, Lawrence - The Greek Islands.
Durrell, Lawrence - The Lawrence Durrell travel reader.
Durrell, Lawrence - Prospero's cell: a guide to the landscape and manners of the island of Corcyra.
Durrell, Lawrence - Reflections on a marine Venus: a companion to the landscape of Rhodes.
Emerson, Mary - Greek sanctuaries: an introduction.
Evans, Peter - Ari: the life and times of Aristotle Socrates Onassis.
Evans, Peter - Nemesis: the true story of Aristotle Onassis, Jackie O, and the love triangle that brought down the Kennedys.
Ferguson, Kitty - The music of Pythagoras: how an ancient brotherhood cracked the code of the universe and lit the path from antiquity to outer space.
Fermor, Patrick Leigh - Mani: Travels in the Southern Peloponnese
Fermor, Patrick Leigh - Roumeli: travels in northern Greece.
Fields, Nic - Ancient Greek fortifications 500--300 BC.
Fone, Byrne R. S. - Homophobia: a history.
Foreman, Laura - Alexander the conqueror: the epic story of the warrior king.
Fox, Robin Lane - Alexander the Great.
Fox, Robin Lane - Travelling heroes: in the epic age of Homer.
France, Peter - A place of healing for the soul: Patmos.
Freely, John - Aladdin's lamp: how Greek science came to Europe through the Islamic world.
Freeman, Charles - The Greek achievement: the foundation of the Western world.
Freeman, Philip - The philosopher and the Druids: a journey among the ancient Celts.
Freke, Timothy - The Jesus mysteries: Was the 'Original Jesus' a Pagan God?
Fuller, J. F. C. - The generalship of Alexander the Great.
Gage, Eleni N. - North of Ithaka: a journey home through a family's extraordinary past.
Gage, Nicholas - Eleni.
Gage, Nicholas - Greek fire: the story of Maria Callas and Aristotle Onassis.
Gage, Nicholas - A place for us.
Gere, Cathy - Knossos and the prophets of modernism.
Gere, Cathy - The tomb of Agamemnon.
Gerolymatos, Andre - Red acropolis, black terror: the Greek Civil War and the origins of Soviet-American rivalry.
Glatt, John - Blind passion: a true story of seduction, obsession, and murder.
Grainger, John D. - Alexander the great failure: the collapse of the Macedonian Empire.
Grant, Michael - The founders of the western world: a history of Greece and Rome.
Grant, Michael - The rise of the Greeks.
Grant, Michael - The visible past: an archaeological reinterpretation of the ancient world.
The great naturalists.
Greece: temples, tombs, & treasures.
Greece: true stories.
Green, Peter - Alexander of Macedon, 356-323 B.C.: a historical biography.
Green, Peter - Ancient Greece: an illustrated history.
Green, Peter - The Hellenistic age: a history.
Green, Roger - Hydra and the bananas of Leonard Cohen: a search for serenity in the sun.
Hale, John R. - Lords of the sea: the epic story of the Athenian navy and the birth of democracy.
Hamel, Debra - Trying Neaira: The True Story of a Courtesan's Scandalous Life in Ancient Greece.
Hamilton, Edith - The Greek way.
Hanson, Victor Davis - A War Like No Other: How the Athenians and Spartans Fought the Peloponnesian War.
Hanson, Victor Davis - Ripples of Battle: How Wars Fought Long Ago Still Determine How We Fight, How We Live, and How We Think.
Hanson, Victor Davis - The Wars of the Ancient Greeks: And the Invention of Western Military Culture.
Hanson, Victor Davis - The Other Greeks: The Family Farm and the Agrarian Roots of Western Civilization
Harrison, Thomas - Greek religion: belief and experience.
Herodotus - The Histories. 
Herodotus - Snakes with wings and gold-digging ants.
Higgins, Charlotte - It's All Greek to Me: from Homer to the Hippocratic Oath, how Ancient Greece has shaped our world.
Hill, Maria - Diggers and Greeks: the Australian campaigns in Greece and Crete.
Hillman, D. C. A. - The chemical muse: drug use and the roots of Western civilization.
Hirshfeld, Alan - Eureka man: the life and legacy of Archimedes.
Hitchens, Christopher - The Elgin marbles: should they be returned to Greece?
Hoffman, Susanna - The olive and the caper: adventures in Greek cooking.
Holland, Tom - Persian Fire: The First World Empire and the Battle for the West.
Homer - The Odyssey.
Hopkins, T. C. F. - Confrontation at Lepanto: Christendom vs. Islam.
Hughes, Bettany - Helen of Troy: Goddess, Princess, Whore.
Huler, Scott - No man's lands: one man's odyssey through The Odyssey.
Kagan, Donald - The Peloponnesian War.
Kagan, Donald - Pericles of Athens and the birth of democracy.
Kagan, Donald - Thucydides: the reinvention of history.
Kakis, Frederic J. - Legacy of courage: a Holocaust survival story in Greece.
Keuls, Eva C. - The reign of the phallus: sexual politics in ancient Athens.
Kidd, Sue Monk - Traveling with Pomegranates: a mother daughter story.
Kirtsoglou, Elisabeth - For the love of women: gender, identity and same-sex relations in a Greek provincial town.
Kulukundis, Elias - The feasts of memory: stories of a Greek family.
Kurke, Lance B. - The wisdom of Alexander the Great: enduring leadership lessons from the man who created an empire.
Lawrence, A. W. - Greek architecture.
Leon, Vicki - How to mellify a corpse: and other human stories of ancient science & superstition.
Lloyd, Alan - Marathon: the story of civilizations on collision course.
Lundberg, David - Olympic wandering: time travel through Greece.
MacKendrick, Paul Lachlan - The Greek Stones Speak: the story of archaeology in Greek lands.
Marchand, Jo - Decoding the heavens: a 2,000-year-old computer -- and the century-long search to discover its secrets.
Martin, Thomas R. - Ancient Greece: from prehistoric to Hellenistic times.
Mason, David - News from the Village: Aegean friends.
Matyszak, Philip - The classical compendium: a miscellany of scandalous gossip, bawdy jokes, peculiar facts, and bad behavior from the ancient Greeks and Romans.
Mazower, Mark - Salonica, City of Ghosts: Christians, Muslims, and Jews, 1430-1950.
Mazur, Joseph - The Motion Paradox: The 2,500-Year-Old Puzzle Behind All the Mysteries of Time and Space.
 Michalopoulos, Dimitri, Homer's Odyssey beyond the myths, The Piraeus: Institute of Hellenic Maritime History, 2016. 
 Michas|Michas, Takis]] - Unholy Alliance: Greece and Milosevic's Serbia.
Miller, Stephen G. - Ancient Greek athletics.
Moore-Pastides, Patricia - Greek revival: cooking for life.
Moorehead, Caroline - Lost and found: the 9,000 treasures of Troy: Heinrich Schliemann and the gold that got away.
Moutsatsos, Kiki Feroudi - The Onassis women: an eyewitness account.
Myer, Will - People of the storm god: travels in Macedonia.
Navia, Luis E. - Socrates: a life examined.
The New Acropolis Museum.
O'Brien, John Maxwell - Alexander the Great: the invisible enemy: a biography.
Osborne, Catherine - Presocratic philosophy: a very short introduction.
Pellegrino, Charles R. - Unearthing Atlantis: an archaeological odyssey to the fabled lost civilization.
Perrottet, Tony - The naked Olympics: the true story of the ancient games.
Perrottet, Tony - Pagan holiday: on the trail of ancient Roman tourists.
Phelps, Michael - No Limits: The Will to Succeed.
Phillips, Graham - Alexander the Great: Murder in Babylon.
Pickover, Clifford A. - Archimedes to Hawking: Laws of Science and the Great Minds Behind Them.
Plutarch - Greek lives: a selection of nine Greek lives.
Poirier-Bures, Simone - That shining place.
Pomeroy, Sarah B. - The murder of Regilla: a case of domestic violence in antiquity.
Prevas, John - Envy of the Gods: Alexander the Great's ill-fated journey across Asia.
Raeburn, Nancy - Mykonos.
Raphael, Frederic - Some Talk of Alexander: A Journey Through Space and Time in the Greek World.
Renault, Mary - The Nature of Alexander.
Rodgers, Nigel - The rise and fall of ancient Greece: the military and political History of the ancient Greeks from the fall of Troy, the Persian Wars and the Battle of Marathon to the campaigns of Alexan.
Rogers, Guy MacLean - Alexander: the ambiguity of greatness.
Sarrinikalaou, George - Facing Athens: encounters with the modern city.
Saunders, Nicholas J. - Alexander's Tomb: the two thousand year obsession to find the lost conqueror.
Scott, Michael - From democrats to kings: the brutal dawn of a new world from the downfall of Athens to the rise of Alexander the Great.
Seferis, George - Six Nights on the Acropolis.
Sidebottom, Harry - Ancient Warfare: a very short introduction.
Silver, Vernon - The lost chalice: the epic hunt for a priceless masterpiece.
Simon, Bennet - Mind and Madness in Ancient Greece: The Classical Roots of Modern Psychiatry 

Sissa, Giulia - Sex and sensuality in the ancient world.
Spawforth, Antony - The complete Greek temples.
Spivey, Nigel Jonathan - The Ancient Olympics: War minus the shooting.
Stefano, Maggi - Greece: history and treasures of an ancient civilization.
Stone, Tom - The summer of my Greek taverna.
Stone, Tom - Zeus: a journey through Greece in the footsteps of a god.
Stoneman, Richard - Alexander the Great: a life in legend.
Strauss, Barry S. - The Battle of Salamis: the naval encounter that saved Greece — and Western civilization.
Strauss, Barry S. - The Trojan War: a new history.
Taylor, C. C. W. - Socrates: a very short introduction.
Taylour, William - The Mycenaeans.
Thompson, Michael - Granicus 334 BC: Alexander's first Persian victory.
Thubron, Colin - The Ancient Mariners.
Thucydides - History of the Peloponnesian War.
Thucydides - The landmark Thucydides: a comprehensive guide to the Peloponnesian War.
Thucydides - The Peloponnesian War: a new translation, backgrounds, interpretations.
Van der Kiste, John - Kings of the Hellenes: the Greek Kings, 1863-1974.
Vandenberg, Philipp - Mysteries of the oracles: the last secrets of antiquity.
Veyne, Paul - Bread and circuses: historical sociology and political pluralism.
Vickers, Hugo - Alice: Princess Andrew of Greece.
Vlanton, Elias - Who killed George Polk?: the press covers up a death in the family.
von Däniken, Erich - Odyssey of the Gods — An Alien History of Ancient Greece.
Vrettos, Theodore - The Elgin affair: the abduction of Antiquity's greatest treasures and the passions it aroused.
Wallechinsky, David - The Complete Book of the Summer Olympics: Athens 2004.
Warry, John Gibson - Warfare in the classical world: an illustrated encyclopedia of weapons, warriors, and warfare in the ancient civilizations of Greece and Rome.
Wasson, R. Gordon - The Road to Eleusus: Unveiling the Secret of the mysteries.
Waterfield, Robin - Athens: From Ancient Ideal to Modern City.
Waterfield, Robin - Why Socrates Died: Dispelling the Myths.
Watefield, Robin - Xenophon's Retreat: Greece, Persia, and the End of the Golden Age
What life was like at the dawn of democracy: classical Athens, 525-322 BC.
Wheatley, Nadia - The Life and Myth of Chairman Clift.
Wood, Ellen Meiksins - Citizens to Lords: A Social History of Western Political Thought from Antiquity to the Middle Ages.
Wood, Michael - In the Footsteps of Alexander the Great: a journey from Greece to Asia.
Woodruff, Paul - First Democracy: The Challenge of an Ancient Idea.
Wright, William - All the pain that money can buy: the life of Christina Onassis.
Xenophon - The Expedition of Cyrus.
Xenophon - The Landmark Xenophon's Hellenika: a new translation.
Xenophon - The Persian Expedition.
Zinovieff, Sofka - Eurydice Street: A Place in Athens.

References

Greek literature
Greece